Bandana Singh is an Indian Politician and a Member of 17th Legislative Assembly of Azamgarh district, Uttar Pradesh state of India. She represents the Sagri Constituency of Uttar Pradesh and is a Member of Bahujan Samaj Party.

Early life and education
Singh was born 24 March 1981 in Tegna, Mau, Uttar Pradesh to her father Shri Ravindra Nath Singh. She married Sarvesh Singh Sipu (Ex MLA of Sagri) in 2003. Sipu was shot dead in 2013 at his home by unknown shooters, they have two sons and one daughter. She belongs to Kshatriya family. She got M.A. degree in 2003 and B.Ed. in 2009 from Veer Bahadur Singh Purvanchal University.

Political career
Singh has been a member of the 17th Legislative Assembly of Uttar Pradesh. Since 2017, she has represented the Sagri constituency and is a member of the Bahujan Samaj Party. She defeated Samajwadi Party candidate Jairam Patel by a margin of 5,475 votes.

Posts held

References

Uttar Pradesh MLAs 2017–2022
Bahujan Samaj Party politicians from Uttar Pradesh
Living people
Politicians from Azamgarh district
1981 births
Bharatiya Janata Party politicians from Uttar Pradesh